Majesty: The Fantasy Kingdom Sim is a real-time strategy video game developed by Cyberlore Studios, and published by Hasbro Interactive under the MicroProse brand name for Windows in March 2000. The game is not a simulator; that part of the title is a witticism, a reference to the game's adherence to fantasy and fantasy role-playing game cliches. In Majesty, players assume the role of king in a fantasy realm called Ardania which features city sewers infested with giant rats, landscapes dotted with ancient evil castles, and soldiers helpless against anything bigger than a goblin. As Sovereign, the player must rely on hiring bands of wandering heroes in order to get anything done. In a major divergence from most real-time strategy games, the player does not have direct control over their units.

MacPlay released a Mac OS port in December 2000. Infogrames released the expansion pack Majesty: The Northern Expansion for Windows in March 2001, and Majesty Gold Edition, a compilation for Windows bundling Majesty and The Northern Expansion, in January 2002. Linux Game Publishing released a Linux port of Majesty Gold Edition in April 2003. Majesty Gold Edition was re-released by Paradox Interactive under the name Majesty Gold HD Edition in March 2012, adding support for higher resolutions and including two downloadable quests that were incompatible with the original release of Majesty: The Northern Expansion.

Gameplay
The game has 19 single player scenarios but no overarching plotline. The Northern Expansion adds new unit abilities, buildings, monsters, and 12 new single player scenarios. Freestyle (sandbox) play and multiplayer are also available.

Henchmen are free non-hero characters that are nonetheless essential to maintaining the realm. Peasants construct and repair buildings. Tax collectors collect gold from guilds and houses to finance the realm. Guards provide defense against monsters. Caravans travel from trading posts to the marketplace, where they deliver gold based on the distance they traveled.

Each scenario (or quest) has a unique map. Even if the player chooses the same quest twice, it will have a map that, while retaining the general terrain of the region, is significantly different. The map is initially shrouded in blackness, but all activity in explored areas can be viewed no matter how far away from a building or character it is, with no fog of war.

In certain quest scenarios, the player also has the ability to interact with other kingdoms. This mainly includes the use of a kingdom's services by the heroes of a foreign faction, although in many cases, the player may choose to attack the foreign faction or will be automatically hostile toward them. In other, rarer instances, heroes may switch sides between kingdoms in the event that their guild has been destroyed and their native kingdom can no longer offer them hospitality.

Buildings
Base-building is comparable to other real-time strategy games of the period, but units are autonomous—a feature usually associated with construction and management simulation games—and possess attributes borrowed from role-playing video games. The Sovereign's actions are limited to constructing and enhancing buildings, using building abilities and spells, hiring heroes, and offering rewards.

The basic building is the palace, and its loss means the loss of the game. Guilds and temples can be used to summon and house heroes (typically four per building), almost all other ones offer equipment or services (inns, royal gardens, etc.). Some guilds and temples may not co-exist, and some buildings require the presence of certain buildings before they are available for construction.

The system of heroes in Majesty is similar to most other sim games. These heroes are not under the direct control of the player, but they can be influenced by reward flags to perform certain tasks, such as slaying a particularly troublesome monster or exploring an unknown area of the map. However, their cooperation is not guaranteed even then. Heroes have free will, though some classes are more inclined to certain actions than other. (For example, a paladin is more likely to attack a dangerous monster than a rogue.)

Each hero has different favored behaviors as well. For example, paladins often choose to raid lairs, while rogues will steal, and elves will perform at inns. Furthermore, rewards influence heroes differently. Rogues will be the first to make an attempt at the rewards, followed soon after by elves or dwarves.

The powers and abilities of the heroes also move in a rock-paper-scissors format. Some monsters are especially weak against ranged attacks, while strong against melee or magic. Other monsters are especially strong against melee and ranged attacks, and magic makes killing them much easier. It is important to plan ahead and be able to defend your kingdom against different types of monsters, exploiting their weaknesses.

Individual heroes gain experience points and level up as they would if they were characters in a role-playing game. Other hero attributes borrowed from role-playing games include ability scores and inventories. Though all heroes in a class share the same in-game sprite and portrait, they all have individual names, have unique stats, and varied levels.

Reception

Majesty was generally well received by the gaming press, with many reviews commenting positively on its unique combination of elements from different genres. The game's Linux port was also well received, with gamers giving it four stars and numerous positive comments on The Linux Game Tome, as well as numerous positive comments at LinuxGames.

The game was reviewed in 2000 in Dragon #269 by Johnny L. Wilson in the "Silycon Sorcery" column. Wilson sums up the game: "Majesty offers a very different feeling than the average strategy or role-playing game in a fantasy world. It is similar to being a Dungeon Master or playing a simplified version of Birthright."

The editors of Computer Gaming World nominated Majesty as the best strategy game of 2000, although it lost to Sacrifice. However, the magazine presented Majesty with a special award "Pleasant Surprise of the Year", and the editors wrote that it "hooked more than one of us with a quick-paced, hands-off formula that defied our expectations and won our hearts."

Daniel Erickson reviewed the PC version of the game for Next Generation, rating it three stars out of five, and stated that "A great take on a classic formula. Only its lack of solid multiplay keeps Majesty out of the top ranks of RTS games."

Legacy

Majesty: The Northern Expansion
Majesty: The Northern Expansion is generally seen as a fine sequel to the critically acclaimed Majesty. It features new unit abilities, buildings, monsters, and twelve new single player scenarios (two of which are in a new "Master" level). Freestyle play is also available and includes new features including those present in the single player quests.

Majesty Gold HD Edition
On March 21, 2012, Paradox Interactive (who had created Majesty 2) released Majesty Gold HD Edition. This version is identical to the standard Gold Edition containing both Majesty and Majesty: The Northern Expansion, but includes support for larger resolutions and native support for Windows 7. It also includes two downloadable quests that were compatible with the original Majesty, but not with the original release of The Northern Expansion.

Sequel
Cyberlore Studios planned a sequel, Majesty Legends, but it was never officially released. The developer cited the lack of a publisher as the reason. In July 2007, Paradox Interactive acquired the intellectual property for Majesty

and released a sequel, Majesty 2: The Fantasy Kingdom Sim, on September 18, 2009.

Majesty Mobile
Mobile "Majesty: The Fantasy Kingdom Sim" is developed and published by HeroCraft and released on January 20, 2011. The game is designed to run on BlackBerry Playbook, iOS, Android, Bada and high-end Nokia Symbian devices. An iOS version is also available for iPhone, iPod touch, and iPad. The game is also available on Microsoft's Windows Phone platform as of March 2012.

Notes

References

External links
The official Majesty: The Fantasy Kingdom Sim home page

The Linux version of Majesty: The Fantasy Kingdom Sim

2000 video games
Fantasy video games
IOS games
Linux games
Classic Mac OS games
MicroProse games
Real-time strategy video games
Symbian games
Video games scored by Kevin Manthei
Video games developed in the United States
Video games developed in Russia
Video games with expansion packs
Windows games
Windows Phone games
Android (operating system) games
Multiplayer and single-player video games
Paradox Interactive games
Linux Game Publishing games
Cyberlore Studios games
HeroCraft games